WCKB, 780 AM, is a radio station in Dunn, North Carolina.  It has a Southern gospel music format.

The locally owned outlet airs church services and other related programming on Sundays in addition to the musical shows. WCKB is owned by NC Central Broadcasters. It transmits with 7,000 watts of power during the day and 1 watt at night.

780 AM is a United States clear-channel frequency.  WCKB reduces nighttime power to prevent interference with the skywave signal of WBBM in Chicago, Illinois.

History
When WCKB signed on in 1946, the letters meant "Where Carolina Keeps Building." Now, general manager Ron Tart says, the letters mean "Where Christians Keep Believing." 

Lincoln "Uncle Linc" Faulk was the general manager and an announcer for 25 years.

John G. Thomas, WCKB news director, interviewed Ermon Godwin Jr. on his "Retrospect" program in 1969. The younger Godwin described how his father Edmon Godwin Sr. described "Hollerin'," saying it was a part of doing morning chores, or a routine at the end of the day, and each person had a distinctive style. Godwin found a tape of George Denning, who still hollered. On a Saturday "Let's Talk" program on WCKB on which Godwin made an appearance, the idea for the Spivey's Corner hollerin' contest began.

"Good Morning Charlie" includes a "Swap Shop" type segment as well as listeners telling what goes on in their lives.

References

External links
Official website

Harnett County, North Carolina
CKB
Southern Gospel radio stations in the United States
Radio stations established in 1946
1946 establishments in North Carolina
CKB